The Field School is a preparatory school in Washington, D.C., located in the old Cafritz mansion on Foxhall Road. The school teaches 6th-12th grade, with about 368 students attending as of the 2019–2020 school year.

Notable alumni

  (class of 1998)
  (class of 1990)
 Joshua Harris (class of 1982), billionaire private equity investor, co-founder of Apollo Global Management, and principal owner of the New Jersey Devils of the NHL and the Philadelphia 76ers of the NBA 
  (class of 1990)
  (class of 1982)
 Spike Jonze, photographer, filmmaker, director and actor known for co-creating MTV's Jackass franchise, as well as directing Where the Wild Things Are (2009) and Her (2013)
 
 Justin Theroux, screenwriter, director, actor and film producer known for his appearances in Charlie's Angels: Full Throttle (2003) and The Spy Who Dumped Me (2018), as well as for his screenwriting work for films such as Tropic Thunder (2008) and Iron Man 2 (2010)
  (class of 1987)

References

Private middle schools in Washington, D.C.
Private high schools in Washington, D.C.
Preparatory schools in Washington, D.C.
Educational institutions established in 1972
1972 establishments in Washington, D.C.